The Maendeleo Democratic Party (MDP) is a political party in Kenya.

History
The MDP was established in 2007. In the 2013 elections the party nominated eight candidates for the National Assembly. It received 0.3% of the vote, winning a single seat, Moses Malulu Injendi in Malava.

References

External links
Official website

Political parties in Kenya
2007 establishments in Kenya
Political parties established in 2007